The 1912 Australia rugby union tour of Canada and the United States was a collection of friendly rugby union games undertaken by the Australia national rugby union team against various invitational teams from Canada and the U.S, and also against the US national team.

The squad's leadership
Dr. Otto Martin Bohrsmann (1869–1944) was tour manager. He was a Sydney physician who served as New South Wales Rugby Union treasurer for a number of years. Howell attributes the team's poor performance to a lack of discipline stemming from weakly imposed tour management. Bohrsmann's name would later be given to the landmark Mona Road, Darling Point, Sydney property Otto, which he bought in 1925 and which was retained by his descendants until 2010. His sister Altona would give her name to another Sydney landmark, a Point Piper home which in 2007 set the mark as Australia's most expensive home when it sold for A$50million.

Billy Hill was the secretary of the New South Wales Rugby Union, he toured with the squad as Assistant Manager and refereed some of the matches. At this time team coaches were frowned upon, with the team captain expected to fulfill these duties.

Ward Prentice had toured with the 1908 Wallabies and had played both Tests of that tour. He had made three further Test appearances for Australia in 1910. He was a rugged on-field leader and the 1912 tour marked his swan-song in international rugby, appearing in fifteen of the sixteen matches. After World War I he had a brief first-grade rugby league career Sydney in 1920.

Tom Richards had also toured with the 1908 Wallabies and had played 1st grade rugby all over the world, making district representative sides in Queensland, New South Wales, South Africa and England. He was a leader in the forwards and a natural selection as tour vice-captain. He would later see active service with the AIF, landing on day one of the Gallipoli Campaign on 25 April 1915 and he would be awarded the Military Cross for conspicuous gallantry on the Western Front.

Tour itinerary
The squad travelled by ship from Sydney to the US on the SS Moana with a number of the touring party confined to their cabins with sea-sickness for the first four days. Howell attributes the team's poor performance record to a focus placed on socialising. The squad was billeted out in college fraternity houses in California where the hospitality played havoc with team discipline. Howell quotes squad member Bob Adamson who spoke of the tour: "We were never in bed. That was the trouble. I've never had such a time in my life"

Tour statistics
The tour took in 16 games with only 11 won by the Wallabies, including the sole Test of the tour played against the US All three matches played in Canada were lost by the Wallabies as well as one of the two matches against Stanford University and one of the three matches played against UC Berkeley. The team played in the light-blue jersey of New South Wales with a Waratah emblem and the word Australia on the chest.

Touring party 
The second match of the 1912 New South Wales v Queensland interstate series acted as a selection trial for the tour and the Blues won the match 12–3 in Sydney. The selectors chose only six Queenslanders in the squad including Tom Richards, Jimmy Flynn, Lou Meibusch, Copper Kent, Peter Cunningham and Bob Willocks. Willocks withdrew from the touring squad before departure and his place was taken by fellow Queenslander William Murphy. Flynn and Meisbusch were still aged 18 years at the start of the tour.

Management

Manager: Dr. Otto Bohrsmann
Assistant: W.W Hill
Captain: Ward Prentice
Vice-Captain: Tom Richards

Full backs
 Alf Dunbar (Newtown, NSW)
 Larry Dwyer (Warratahs-Orange, Western Districts, NSW)

Three-quarters
 Bob Adamson (Sydney University, NSW)
 Daniel Carroll (St. George, NSW)
 Jimmy Flynn (Brothers, Queensland) 
 Herbert Jones (Newcastle, NSW)
 Lou Meibusch (Past Grammar-Toowoomba, Queensland)

Half backs
 Ward Prentice (West Suburbs, NSW)
 William Tasker (Newtown, NSW)
 Arthur Walker (Eastern Suburbs, NSW)

Forwards
 Jimmy Clarken (Glebe, NSW)
 Peter Cunningham (Eastern Suburbs, Queensland)
 Ted Fahey (Eastern Suburbs, NSW)
 Harold George (Eastern Suburbs, NSW)
 Tom Griffen (Glebe, NSW)
 Ralph Hill (Newtown)
 Allan Kent (Past Grammar-Toowoomba, Queensland)
 William Murphy (Brothers, Queensland)
 George Pugh (Newtown, NSW)
 Tom Richards (Natives-Charters Towers, Queensland)
 William Watson (Newtown, NSW)

Match summary 
Complete list of matches played by the Wallabies in the Canada and the United States:

 Test matches

Match details

United States

Bibliography
 Howell, Max (2005) Born to Lead – Wallaby Test Captains, Celebrity Books, Auckland NZ
 The Newcastle Herald, Tuesday 2 March 1982, page 16 (re H.A. Jones)

References

Australia national rugby union team tours
Rugby union tours of Canada
Rugby union tours of the United States
tour
1912 in Canadian rugby union